The 1958–59 season was Chelsea Football Club's forty-fifth competitive season. The club played in European competition for the first time, and reached the quarter-finals of the Inter-Cities Fairs Cup, where they lost on aggregate to a Belgrade XI. With 32 league goals, Jimmy Greaves was the First Division's top goalscorer, becoming the first Chelsea played to achieve this.

Table

Notes

References

External links
 1958–59 season at stamford-bridge.com

1958–59
English football clubs 1958–59 season